"99 Miles From L.A."  is a 1975 single written by Albert Hammond and Hal David and performed by Hammond. The song was Hammond's only number one on the Easy Listening chart as well as his most successful release on the chart. "99 Miles From L.A." spent one week at number one and peaked at number ninety-one on the Billboard Hot 100.

Cover versions
 The song was included as a track on Art Garfunkel's 1975 album, Breakaway.
 A new version of this song was included as a track on Albert Hammond's 1977 album, When I Need You.
 In 1990, Julio Iglesias covered the song for his album Starry Night.
 Johnny Mathis covered the song live on his 1975 album "Feelings".
 Dionne Warwick covered the song on her 50th Anniversary Album "Now".
 Nancy Sinatra covered the song on her 2002 album California Girl.
 Stevie Holland covered the song on her 2015 album Life Goes On.
 Claire Small covered the song on the 2012 album Even More Songs Of Route 66: From Here To There

In Popular Culture
 The song provides the title of the first novel by filmmaker/author P. David Ebersole, published by Pelekinesis in 2022.

See also
List of number-one adult contemporary singles of 1975 (U.S.)

References

1975 singles
Songs written by Albert Hammond
Songs with lyrics by Hal David
Albert Hammond songs
Epic Records singles
1975 songs
Art Garfunkel songs
Songs about Los Angeles